Kabuscorp S.C.P. is a sports club from Luanda, Angola. The men's and women's handball teams compete at the Luanda Provincial Handball Championships and at the Angola National Handball Championships as well as at continental level, at the annual African Handball Champions League competitions.

Men's

Honours
National Championship:
Winner (2): 2009, 2010
 Runner Up (3) : 2008, 2011, 2012
Angola Cup:
Winner (0): 
 Runner Up (0) :
Angola Super Cup:
Winner (1): 2010
 Runner Up (0) :
CHAB Club Champions Cup:
Winner (0): 
 Runner Up (0) :
CHAB Cup Winner's Cup:
Winner (0): 
 Runner Up (0) :

Squad

Manager history

Women

Squad

Former squads

2013 squad (men)

See also
Kabuscorp Football
Angolan Handball Federation

References

External links
 

Angolan handball clubs
Handball clubs established in 1994
1994 establishments in Angola
Sports clubs in Luanda